The 2005 PlaceMakers V8 International was a motor race for V8 Supercars held on the weekend of 15 - 17 April 2005. The event was held at the Pukekohe Park Raceway in Pukekohe, New Zealand, and consisted of three races culminating in 400 kilometers. It was the second round of thirteen in the 2005 V8 Supercar Championship Series and the first of two international events on the calendar.

The third race of the weekend was significant as the race was red-flagged due to a huge crash involving Craig Baird and Paul Dumbrell. As the race was entering its final stages, the rain was starting to descend upon the circuit. The first person to have gotten trapped out by the lack of grip on the circuit was Steven Ellery, who had gotten sideways over Ford Mountain. He was followed by Jamie Whincup who had an even closer encounter with the wall. As Whincup re-entered the circuit, this caused Baird to move over to the right-hand side of the circuit in order to give as much room to the corresponding vehicle. By this time however, Dumbrell was attempting an ambitious move up the inside, but the diminishing gap meant that Dumbrell had nowhere to go. Dumbrell had initially clipped the side of Baird's car which set off a 'ricochet effect' where he then bounced off the wall and then back into Baird where he provided a significant hit to send both into a high-speed spin.

Baird's car spun off toward the right-hand side of the circuit and collided with the wooden paddock fencing. Dumbrell meanwhile had spun the left-hand side of the circuit and he too collided with the wall. Both cars, as well as the circuit, ended up with significant damage. The delay in repairing the circuit meant that the race was delayed by nearly thirty minutes and thereby finished under lights with Murphy as the winner.

Results

Qualifying

Top Ten Shootout

Race 1

Race 2

Race 3

References

Pukekohe
Motorsport in New Zealand
2005 in New Zealand motorsport